Joseph Ryalls (3 January 1881 – 6 March 1952) was an English professional footballer who played as an outside right in the Football League for Barnsley, Nottingham Forest and The Wednesday.

Career statistics

References

English footballers
Brentford F.C. players
English Football League players
Association football outside forwards
Sheffield Wednesday F.C. players
Barnsley F.C. players
Southern Football League players
1881 births
Footballers from Sheffield
Fulham F.C. players
Rotherham Town F.C. (1899) players
Nottingham Forest F.C. players
Midland Football League players
Chesterfield F.C. players
1952 deaths